Circoloco is a dance party that is held at the DC10 nightclub in Ibiza, Spain, as well as other various locations globally. Circoloco features musical artists from the genre of electronic music, house music, and techno, such as The Martinez Brothers, Seth Troxler, Tale of Us, Black Coffee, and The Blessed Madonna. The event was founded in 1999 by Italian promoters Andrea Pelino and Antonio Carbonaro, in conjunction with the DC10 nightclub.

History 
Circoloco was founded in July 1999 by Antonio Carbonaro and Andrea Pelino and was first hosted at the DC10 nightclub in Ibiza, Spain. Circoloco was first intended as an after-party hosted on Mondays after other events, such as the 24-hour event Space. Circoloco has hosted events in other locations, such as Los Angeles, Miami, New York City, and Tokyo. In 2018, a collaboration with the Italian clothing brand Off-White was released. Several CircoLoco events were cancelled in 2020 due to the ongoing COVID-19 pandemic. In May 2021, Circoloco and American video game publisher Rockstar Games announced CircoLoco Records, a joint venture between the companies.

Over the years CircoLoco built its own community, evolving from an underground music party on Mondays to a recognized global movement with a unique, almost tribal sense of belonging that is the common denominator for those who attend its parties.

Circoloco has travelled worldwide outside of Ibiza throughout the past number of years, with shows in some of the main cities such as New York, Miami, London, Milan, Paris, Amsterdam, Tel Aviv, Rio de Janeiro & Phuket to name but a few. Throughout the last two decades, Circoloco has been attended by a variety of well known celebrities and influential individuals. Most recently, Leonardo DiCaprio attended their 2022 Halloween event in Brooklyn, New York. 

Known for tapping DJs at the early stages of their career and platforming female DJs — who are often underrepresented on nightclub rosters — CircoLoco has amassed an intercontinental cult following off of Carbonaro’s fluid approach to curating and booking acts. This past summer’s 24-date run, the longest party season in CircoLoco history, placed the likes of industry veterans Peggy Gou and Blond:ish alongside growing cult-favorite acts such as Sweden’s Kornél Kovács. 

CircoLoco has always been an inclusive, multicultural, transversal movement that attracts eager partygoers of all age groups, nationalities, classes and backgrounds. Under its logos and distinctive red lighting, it unites very different people in large-scale events that are celebrated around the world as state-of-the-art in terms of electronic music quality.

CircoLoco Records 

CircoLoco Records is a record label founded as a joint venture between Circoloco and Rockstar Games, and was announced on May 24, 2021. Artists associated with Circoloco and electronic music in general, such as Tale of Us, The Blessed Madonna, and Moodymann, have been previously featured in Grand Theft Auto Online, an online multiplayer game published by Rockstar Games. Songs from the Monday Dreamin' EPs can be listened to at fictional nightclubs and radio stations within the game, and some songs received remixes from Seth Troxler exclusive to the game's Los Santos Tuners update.

In July of this year we saw the release of Skream's 'The Attention Deficit EP' - in collaboration with Jackmaster. The full EP released on CircoLoco Records, on July 15. Both the lead tune and extended 'Terrace Mix' combines Italian vocal fragments with punchy drums to create an upbeat, infectious record.

Songs and albums released under the CircoLoco Records name are copyrighted by a Take-Two Interactive subsidiary; Rockstar Records, LLC.

Discography

CircoLoco X Adidas Originals 

On July 25, 2022 - A love story between footwear and the dancefloor began, as the brand with the Three Stripes met Ibiza's OG shape-cutters,  to create the adidas x Circoloco Forum Lo sneaker and adidas x Circoloco adilette slide. 

The two-shoe drop presents CircoLoco's take on adidas’ Forum Lo sneaker and adilette slides. Both of the designs take inspiration from the Ibiza nightclub and are adorned in CircoLoco's distinctive red and black coloring.

The footwear collaboration was revealed Monday July 25, as CircoLoco celebrates the 23rd birthday of its weekly residency at Ibiza's DC10. Every Monday this summer, and for 22 years prior, CircoLoco celebrates the no-nonsense and, nostalgic sense of what dance music should be.   From its namesake party in Ibiza, CircoLoco has grown into a global music brand and veritable lifestyle, catalyzing cultural exchange with the most brilliant minds in the art, fashion and entertainment worlds.

To further celebrate this singular collaboration, CircoLoco invited adidas Originals to design their iconic clown logo for their anniversary party, which stars the likes of Keinemusik's &Me and Rampa, Black Coffee, Peggy Gou, Seth Troxler, Gerd Janson, TSHA, Luciano and more.

References 

Music events
Music events in Spain
Record labels established in 2021
Joint ventures
Rockstar Games